Coleophora helianthemella is a moth of the family Coleophoridae. It is found in France, on the Iberian Peninsula and Sardinia, as well as in Italy, Greece and on Cyprus.

The larvae feed on Cistus, Fumana, Helianthemum and Tuberaria species. They create a composite leaf case. The case is reddish brown, although the rear end is yellow. Sometimes, the case is entirely yellow. It is less than 10 mm long and the mouth angle is about 30°.

References

helianthemella
Moths described in 1870
Moths of Europe